Isaac Lacey (December 1, 1776 in Litchfield, Litchfield County, Connecticut – April 28, 1844 in Chili Center, Monroe County, New York) was an American politician from New York.

Life
He was the son of Ebenezer Lacey and Mary (Hurd) Lacey.

In 1816, he removed from White Creek, New York to a place in Genesee County which in 1822 became part of the Town of Chili, now in Monroe County.

He was a member of the New York State Assembly (Monroe Co.) in 1826 and 1831.

He was a member of the New York State Senate (8th D.) from 1835 to 1838, sitting in the 58th, 59th, 60th and 61st New York State Legislatures.

He was buried at the Fellows Cemetery in South Chili.

Assemblyman John T. Lacey (b. 1808) was his son.

Sources
The New York Civil List compiled by Franklin Benjamin Hough (pages 130ff, 142, 204, 211 and 286; Weed, Parsons and Co., 1858)
Pen and Ink Portraits of Senators, Assemblymen and State Officers of the State of New York by G. W. Bungay (Albany NY, 1857; pg. 38 "JOHN T. LACEY")

External links

1776 births
1844 deaths
New York (state) state senators
Anti-Masonic Party politicians from New York (state)
People from White Creek, New York
People from Chili, New York
New York (state) Whigs
19th-century American politicians
Members of the New York State Assembly
Politicians from Litchfield, Connecticut